Kangaroo Island wine region is a wine region which covers the full extent of Kangaroo Island in South Australia. The wine region is one of five wine regions comprising the Fleurieu zone. The term ‘Kangaroo Island’ was registered as an Australian Geographical Indication under the Wine Australia Corporation Act 1980 on 8 December 2000. As of 2014, the region is reported as containing at least 30 growers and 12 wineries.

See also

South Australian wine

Citations and references

Citations

References

External links
Kangaroo Island Wine Region tourism webpage

Wine regions of South Australia
Kangaroo Island